Paul Kamela (born 4 April 1962) is a Cameroonian boxer. He competed at the 1980 Summer Olympics, 1984 Summer Olympics and the 1988 Summer Olympics.

References

1962 births
Living people
Cameroonian male boxers
Olympic boxers of Cameroon
Boxers at the 1980 Summer Olympics
Boxers at the 1984 Summer Olympics
Boxers at the 1988 Summer Olympics
Place of birth missing (living people)
Light-welterweight boxers
20th-century Cameroonian people